Clément Roman (born 22 February 1938) is a Belgian racing cyclist. He rode in the 1963 Tour de France.

References

1938 births
Living people
Belgian male cyclists
Place of birth missing (living people)